Vasile Mariuţan (8 March 1935 – 14 July 1999) was a Romanian boxer. He competed at the 1960 Summer Olympics and the 1964 Summer Olympics.

References

External links

1935 births
1999 deaths
Romanian male boxers
Olympic boxers of Romania
Boxers at the 1960 Summer Olympics
Boxers at the 1964 Summer Olympics
People from Khotyn
Heavyweight boxers